The genus Foxia is a group of cleptoparasitic bembicine wasps that occur in xeric habitats in the New World. There are 10 described species, ranging from Chile and Argentina to the United States.

Species
These 10 species belong to the genus Foxia:
 Foxia cuna Pate, 1938 i c g
 Foxia deserticola Fritz, 1959 i c g
 Foxia divergens (Ducke, 1903) i c g
 Foxia garciai Fritz, 1972 i c g
 Foxia martinezi Fritz, 1972 i c g
 Foxia navajo Pate, 1938 i c g b
 Foxia pacifica Ashmead, 1898 i c g
 Foxia pirita Fritz, 1972 i c g
 Foxia secunda (Rohwer, 1921) i c g
 Foxia tercera Fritz, 1972 i c g
Data sources: i = ITIS, c = Catalogue of Life, g = GBIF, b = Bugguide.net

References

Crabronidae
Hymenoptera of South America
Apoidea genera